Alexander Averbukh may refer to:

 Aleksandr Averbukh (born 1974), Israeli pole vaulter
 Alexander Vladimirovich Averbukh (born 1957), Russian journalist, broadcaster and teacher